Laurent Clare Egan (born November 19, 1987) is an American biathlete. She has represented the United States in World Cup Biathlon from 2015 through the 2018-2019 season and at the 2018 Winter Olympics in PyeongChang.  Clare was elected in 2018 to chair the International Biathlon Union Athletes’ Committee until 2022.

She qualified to represent the United States at the 2022 Winter Olympics.

Life
Egan is originally from Cape Elizabeth, Maine. She was a stand-out runner and skier at Cape Elizabeth High School, from which she graduated in 2006. 
Egan attended Wellesley College and received a master's degree from the University of New Hampshire; she speaks six languages.

Biathlon results
All results are sourced from the International Biathlon Union.

Olympic Games
0 medals

World Championships
0 medals

*During Olympic seasons competitions are only held for those events not included in the Olympic program.
**The single mixed relay was added as an event in 2019.

References

External links 

1987 births
Living people
American female biathletes
Olympic biathletes of the United States
Biathletes at the 2018 Winter Olympics
Biathletes at the 2022 Winter Olympics
Sportspeople from Maine
21st-century American women
People from Cape Elizabeth, Maine